John Brady Garnett (born December 15, 1940) is an American mathematician at the University of California, Los Angeles, known for his work in harmonic analysis. He received his Ph.D. at the University of Washington in 1966, under the supervision of Irving Glicksberg. He received the Steele Prize for Mathematical Exposition in 2003 for his book, Bounded Analytic Functions. As of June 2011, he has supervised the dissertations of 25 students including Peter Jones and Jill Pipher.

In 2012 he became a fellow of the American Mathematical Society.

Publications
 
  
 with Donald E. Marshall:

References

External links
 Faculty page at UCLA
 

Living people
1940 births
20th-century American mathematicians
21st-century American mathematicians
University of California, Los Angeles faculty
Fellows of the American Mathematical Society
University of Washington alumni